Jean Saint-Josse (born 22 March 1944 in Coarraze, Pyrénées-Atlantiques) is a French politician and former member of the Rally for the Republic (RPR), he is  the leader of the ruralist Hunting, Fishing, Nature and Traditions (CPNT) party.

In the 2002 presidential election  he won 4.23%  as candidate of CPNT. He is a former Member of the European Parliament (MEP).

References

1944 births
Living people
People from Béarn
Rally for the Republic MEPs
MEPs for France 1999–2004
Candidates in the 2002 French presidential election
Hunting, Fishing, Nature and Traditions politicians
Mayors of places in Nouvelle-Aquitaine